Emine Tuğba Palazoğlu (born 4 December 1980) is a Turkish former professional basketball player.

Honors
Galatasaray
Turkish Presidents Cup
Winners (1): 2008
EuroCup Women
Winners (1): 2008–2009
Fenerbahçe
Turkish Presidents Cup
Winners (1): 2014
Turkish Cup
Winners (1): 2015

References

Tuğba Palazoğlu to set for Fenerbahçe

External links
Profile at tbl.org.tr
Player Profile at Eurobasket Women 2009

1980 births
Living people
Barton Cougars women's basketball players
Basketball players at the 2012 Summer Olympics
Beşiktaş women's basketball players
Fenerbahçe women's basketball players
Galatasaray S.K. (women's basketball) players
Mersin Büyükşehir Belediyesi women's basketball players
Migrosspor basketball players
Olympic basketball players of Turkey
Shooting guards
Turkish expatriate basketball people in the United States
Turkish women's basketball players
Western Illinois Leathernecks women's basketball players